Mylott is a surname. Notable people with the surname include:

Eva Mylott (1875–1920), Australian opera singer
Patrick Mylott (1820–1878), Irish British Army officer and Victoria Cross recipient